Parliamentary elections were held in the Central African Republic on 5 and 29 April 1959. The result was a victory for the Movement for the Social Evolution of Black Africa (MESAN), which won all 48 contested seats on election day. Two seats were left vacant, and the vote for one seat won by MESAN was declared void. In a re-run, all three seats were won by MESAN, giving it all 50 seats in the National Assembly. Voter turnout was 56.71%.

Results

References

Central Africa
Elections in the Central African Republic
1959 in the Central African Republic